De Havilland Aircraft of Canada Limited (DHC) is a Canadian aircraft manufacturer that has produced numerous aircraft models since its inception including the popular Dash 8. The company's primary facilities were located in the Downsview area of Toronto, Ontario for many years but will now relocate to DHC's newest manufacturing facility, De Havilland Field, under development near Calgary, Alberta. The aircraft types currently in production or planned for production include the DHC-6 Twin Otter, DHC-8 Dash 8, and DHC-515 Firefighter.

The aircraft company was created in 1928 by the British de Havilland Aircraft Company to build Moth aircraft for the training of Canadian airmen, and subsequently after the Second World War, designed and produced indigenous designs.

In the 1980s, the government of Canada under Prime Minister Brian Mulroney privatized DHC and in 1986 sold the aircraft company to then Seattle-based Boeing. DHC was eventually acquired by Montreal-based Bombardier Aerospace in 1992.
In 2006, Viking Air of Victoria, British Columbia, purchased the type certificates for all the original out-of-production de Havilland designs (DHC-1 to DHC-7).

In November 2018, Viking Air's holding company, Longview Aviation Capital, announced the acquisition of the Q400 program, along with the rights to the de Havilland name and trademark. The deal, which closed on 3 June 2019 following regulatory approval, brought the entire de Havilland product line under the same banner for the first time in decades, under a new holding company named De Havilland Aircraft of Canada Limited.

In the summer of 2021, De Havilland stopped production at its Downsview site and officially closed it in the summer of 2022 at the end of its lease. In September 2022, De Havilland announced the construction of a new manufacturing facility called De Havilland Field in Alberta. The new facility is intended to merge its two manufacturing facilities and produce the Twin Otter and Dash 8 planes, as well as the new DHC-515 firefighting aircraft. First production at the new site is scheduled to begin in 2025.

Establishment 
Founded in 1928 as a subsidiary of de Havilland Aircraft (UK), de Havilland Canada was first located at De Lesseps Field in Toronto, before moving to Downsview Airport in 1929.

The original home of De Havilland Canada was the Canadian Air and Space Museum located in what is now Downsview Park.

Pre-Second World War 

Flown for the first time on 26 October 1931, the DH.82 Tiger Moth was derived from the DH.60 Moth. The DH 82 was powered by a 120-hp Gipsy II engine, but the 1939 DH.82a received the 145-hp Gipsy Major. More than 1,000 Tiger Moths were delivered before the Second World War, and subsequently 4,005 were built in the UK and shipped all over the world; 1,747 were built in Canada (the majority being the DH.82c model with enclosed cockpits, brakes, tail wheels, etc.). The follow-up DH.83 Fox Moth was designed in England in 1932 as a light, economical transport and was built using as many Tiger Moth components as possible.

Second World War 
The de Havilland Tiger Moth was a basic trainer of the British Commonwealth Air Training Plan  during the Second World War, whereby air crews from all over the British Commonwealth trained in Canada. DHC was the Canadian unit of the parent British de Havilland and during World War II was made into a crown corporation of the government of Canada.

Production of the Mosquito, nicknamed the "Mossie", was the company's greatest contribution to the war effort. It was one of the few  front-line aircraft of the era constructed almost entirely of wood and was nicknamed the "Wooden Wonder". The Mosquito was designed to use speed instead of defensive armament to evade attack, and as a result, it was one of the fastest aircraft in the war, reaching 425 mph at 30,000 ft. The original design was intended as a light bomber, but soon proved itself in high-level photography and every phase of intruder operations.

Of the more than 7,000 Mosquitoes produced overall by de Havilland, de Havilland Canada produced 1,134.  Some 500 were delivered to the UK by the end of the war, although several were lost en route across the Atlantic.

Post-war era 
After the war, de Havilland Canada began to build its own designs uniquely suited to the harsh Canadian operating environment.  The company also continued production of several British de Havilland aircraft and later produced a licence-built version of the American-designed Grumman S2F Tracker. In 1962, the Avro Canada aircraft production facility was transferred to de Havilland Canada by their then-merged parent company, UK-based Hawker Siddeley.

DHC-1 Chipmunk 

The first true postwar aviation project was the DHC-1 Chipmunk, designed as a primary trainer, a replacement for the venerable Tiger Moth. The Chipmunk was an all-metal, low-wing, tandem two-place, single-engined airplane with a conventional landing gear, powered by a de Havilland Gipsy Major engine. The Chipmunk prototype first flew on 22 May 1946 in Toronto. DHC built 217 in Canada, and it was also produced under licence by de Havilland in the UK, which produced 1,000, and by OGMA in Portugal, which built an additional 66. The Chipmunk served with the RCAF, the Royal Air Force (RAF), and at least twelve other air forces. After being largely phased out by the RAF and RCAF in the 1950s and 1960s, surplus Chipmunks achieved widespread popularity for civil sport flying, competition aerobatics, aerial application, and glider towing.

DHC-2 Beaver 

Developed in 1947 for bush flying, the DHC-2 Beaver was designed with input from Canada's bush pilots, who desired a rugged and highly versatile "aerial truck" that would reliably deliver short takeoff and landing (STOL) performance from unimproved airstrips with a half-ton load. An all-metal, high wing monoplane, the Beaver could be equipped with wheels, skis, or floats, and was originally powered by a single Pratt & Whitney R-985 Wasp Junior piston engine. The Beaver was soon adopted by the US Air Force (USAF) and US Army as a liaison aircraft, remaining in service well into the 1970s, and was also used by the militaries of numerous other nations, including Britain, Chile, and  Colombia. With almost 1,700 built in a production run lasting two decades, civil Beavers continue plying their trade in many countries around the world. A turboprop conversion, the Turbo Beaver first flew in December 1963, featuring a Pratt & Whitney PT6A engine. The Turbo Beaver offered improved operating weights and STOL performance, along with a longer cabin, allowing maximum accommodation for 11 including the pilot. DHC offered turboprop conversion kits to upgrade piston-powered Beavers, and similar conversions have been performed by aftermarket companies.

DHC-3 Otter 

A follow-on design to the Beaver—originally conceived in 1951 as the King Beaver—the DHC-3 Otter was designed for the same basic roles and is similar in layout, but is a substantially larger and heavier aircraft, a veritable "one-ton truck" that can seat up to eleven. The Otter was originally produced with a 450-kW (600-hp) Pratt & Whitney R-1340 Wasp radial engine, and like the Beaver, the Otter can be fitted with skis and floats; the Otter amphibian features a four-unit retractable undercarriage, with the wheels retracting into the floats. The type's first flight was undertaken on 12 December 1951 and Canadian certification was awarded in November 1952. The US Army became the largest user of the Otter, and other military users included Australia, Canada, and India. Some Otters have been converted to turboprop power by Cox Air Services using a Pratt & Whitney Canada PT6A turboprop, yielding a lower empty weight and a higher maximum speed, and a number of other aftermarket PT6A conversions have been offered. The Otter found a significant niche as a STOL bush aircraft and many remain in service.

DHC-4 Caribou 

The DHC-4 Caribou was a rugged STOL design like the Beaver and Otter, but it had two engines and was conceived primarily as a military transport, designed in response to a US Army requirement for a tactical airlifter to supply the battlefront with troops and supplies and evacuate casualties on the return journey. The DHC-4 first flew on 30 July 1958. The US Army ordered five for evaluation and went on to become the largest Caribou operator, taking delivery of 159, initially as the AC-1 and later as the CV-2. These aircraft were transferred to the USAF in 1967 and redesignated as the C-7, seeing extensive service during the Vietnam War, where some were captured by North Vietnamese forces and operated until the late 1970s. Other notable military operators included Canada, Australia, Malaysia, India, and Spain. The type's ruggedness and STOL capabilities also appealed to some commercial users and US certification was awarded on 23 December 1960. Other Caribou entered commercial service after being retired by the military, and some civil Caribou have been fitted with turboprop engines.

DHC-5 Buffalo 

Known originally as the Caribou II, the DHC-5 Buffalo was basically an enlarged DHC-4 with turboprop engines and a T-tail, developed to meet a US Army requirement for a STOL tactical airlifter with greater load-carrying ability than the DHC-4. The Buffalo made its maiden flight on 9 April 1964, but the US Army soon transferred heavy fixed-wing aircraft operations to the USAF, which had little interest in the Buffalo; only four evaluation aircraft were delivered to the US military, two of which were later transferred to NASA for research. The improved DHC-5A transport was acquired by Canadian Armed Forces (as the CC-115), the Brazilian Air Force and the Peruvian Air Force, and the production line was then shut down, but it was reopened after the enhanced DHC-5D was introduced in response to interest by other military users. In the early 1980s, de Havilland Canada attempted to market the Buffalo for civil use as the "Transporter", but the demonstration aircraft crashed at the 1984 Farnborough Airshow and the project was abandoned.

DHC-6 Twin Otter 

One of Canada's most successful commercial aircraft designs with more than 800 built, the Twin Otter remains popular for its rugged construction and STOL capabilities. Development dates back to January 1964, when DHC commenced work on a twin turboprop variant of the DHC-3 Otter as a STOL commuter airliner and utility transport. The wings were lengthened, the rear fuselage, tail, and nose were redesigned, and seating capacity was increased to 18. Design features included double-slotted trailing-edge flaps and flaperons (ailerons that act in unison with the flaps) to boost STOL performance. The type's first flight on 20 May 1965. After receiving certification in mid-1966, the first Twin Otter variant, the Series 100, entered service with the Ontario Department of Lands and Forests. The Series 200, introduced in April 1968, had an extended nose and reconfigured rear cabin storage compartment, greatly increasing cargo space. The Series 300, introduced in 1969, had more powerful engines, allowing a 450-kg (1,000-lb) increase in takeoff weight and a 20-seat interior. All models can be fitted with skis or floats. DHC production ceased in late 1988, but in 2010, Viking Air restarted Twin Otter production with the introduction of the Series 400. Production was suspended during the COVID-19 pandemic; in July 2022, the company announced that it was reviewing the programme and supply chain, with a decision on when to resume production expected "in the near future".

DHC-7 Dash 7 

It was meant to serve small city airports, where noise abatement requirements were particularly strict, and featured four slow-turning propellers to cut noise. To enhance its STOL performance, the Dash 7 employs many aerodynamic devices, such as double-slotted wing flaps that span about 75% of the trailing edge of the wing and four spoilers per wing; on landing, the flaps partially retract and the spoilers fully deploy to maximize braking. Financial backing from the Canadian government allowed the launch of the DHC-7 program in the early 1970s, resulting in the maiden flight on 27 March 1975. The type was certificated on 2 May 1977 and entered service with Rocky Mountain Airways on 3 February 1978. Offered in passenger, freighter, and combi aircraft configurations, production of the Dash 7 ended in 1988 following Boeing's takeover of DHC.

DHC-8 Dash 8 

De Havilland Canada began development of the Dash 8 in the late 1970s in response to high anticipated demand for regional airliners. Like the Dash 7, the Dash 8 features a high-mounted wing and T-tail, an advanced flight control system, and large full-length trailing-edge flaps, but power is supplied by two Pratt & Whitney Canada PW120 turboprops, emphasizing operating economy over STOL performance—a major departure for DHC that proved very successful. The first flight took place on 20 June 1983, Canadian certification was awarded on 28 September 1984, and the first customer delivery was to NorOntair on 23 October 1984. When the Dash 8 was introduced, many older regional airliners were becoming obsolescent and expensive to operate but few modern aircraft were immediately available to replace them, leading to substantial Dash 8 sales; to date, over 1,000 have been delivered. The Dash 8 has been offered in several lengths and operating weights, but in 2008, Bombardier announced the discontinuation of the shorter and less powerful variants, leaving the Q400 as the only Dash 8 still in production.

As of February 2023, De Havilland Canada has four DHC-8s registered with Transport Canada and operate as ICAO airline designator DHC, and telephony DEHAVILLAND.

DHC-515 Firefighter 

In 2022, de Havilland Canada announced that an improved version of the Canadair CL-415 amphibious aerial firefighting aircraft will be produced at a new assembly line in Calgary, Alberta, as the DHC-515 Firefighter.

Aircraft built under licence 

The de Havilland Canada company produced a large number of aircraft under licence, mostly versions of designs from its original parent company, British de Havilland Aircraft.

de Havilland Fox Moth 
Fox Moths were produced in Canada after the Second World War mainly to keep the plant in production, but also to satisfy the increasing need for new bush aircraft. All the Canadian modifications made to the Tiger Moth were also applied to the Fox Moth. de Havilland designed a special stretcher for the Fox Moth, so it could operate as an air ambulance. Of the 53 produced, 39 remained in Canada, most of which were operated in float/ski configuration and gave years of satisfactory service.

The Fox Moth, though efficient, was a bit of an anachronism. For example, a modern, moulded plexiglas sliding cockpit hood was attached to what was essentially a 1932 aircraft. Communication between the passenger cabin in the fuselage and the cockpit to the rear was through a hole in the instrument panel.

de Havilland Mosquito 
Before the end of the Second World War, de Havilland Canada built 1,134  Mosquitos, of which 444 were on strength with the RCAF in models Bomber Mk VII through Trainer Mk 29 from 1 June 1943 to 28 September 1951.

de Havilland Canada (Grumman) CS2F Tracker 
In 1954, the Royal Canadian Navy decided to replace its fleet of obsolescent Grumman TBM Avenger antisubmarine warfare (ASW) aircraft with domestically produced, licence-built versions of the new Grumman S2F Tracker. The contract for the CS2F was worth , at the time, the largest post-Second World War Canadian defence contract. Subassemblies of the aircraft would be produced by various Canadian companies and shipped to de Havilland Canada facilities, where de Havilland would build the forward fuselage and crew compartment, assemble the aircraft, oversee installation of the ASW electronics, and prepare the aircraft for delivery.

The first Canadian-built Tracker flew on 31 May 1956. A total of 99 Trackers was produced for RCN service starting in the same year. A few of these aircraft would serve with the Canadian military until the 1990s.

A few ex-CF Trackers were sold to Ministry of Natural Resources (Ontario) (and later resold to Conair) for forest firefighting duties.

Hydrofoil 

HMCS Bras d'Or (FHE 400) was a hydrofoil built from 1960 to 1967 for the Royal Canadian Navy. It served  from 1968 to 1971 as a testing platform for antisubmarine warfare technology on an ocean-going hydrofoil. During sea trials in 1969, the vessel exceeded 63 knots (117 km/h; 72 mph), making her possibly the fastest warship in the world. The vessel was constructed at Marine Industries Limited of Sorel, Quebec, with de Havilland Canada the prime contractor.

Retired by the navy, the hydrofoil now is displayed at the Musée maritime du Québec in L'Islet-sur-Mer, Quebec.

Privatization 

In the 1980s, the government of Canada privatized DHC and in 1986 sold the aircraft company to then Seattle-based Boeing. The government claimed to have guarantees from Boeing not to discontinue any product lines, but shortly thereafter, Boeing discontinued both the successful Twin Otter and the Dash 7.  The jigs and specialised equipment for their manufacture were destroyed.

Boeing was in heavy competition with Airbus Industrie for a series of new airliners for Air Canada, at that time a Canadian crown corporation. Boeing used the DHC purchase to further strengthen its commitment to shared production contracts. The contract was particularly contentious. When Air Canada announced that Airbus had won the contract in 1988, amid claims of bribery, Boeing immediately put DHC up for sale, placing the company in jeopardy.

Sale to Bombardier 
DHC was eventually acquired by Montreal-based Bombardier Aerospace in 1992. DHC was eventually incorporated into the Bombardier group of companies and the Dash 8 remained in production, with a particular emphasis being placed on its quiet operation in comparison to other aircraft of a similar size.  This product line was expanded to four models, and the largest is labelled Q400.

Purchase by Viking/Longview 
On 24 February 2006, Viking Air of Victoria purchased the type certificates from Bombardier Aerospace for all the original de Havilland designs, including:

 DHC-1 Chipmunk
 DHC-2 Beaver
 DHC-3 Otter
 DHC-4 Caribou
 DHC-5 Buffalo
 DHC-6 Twin Otter
 DHC-7 Dash 7

The ownership of the certificates gives Viking the exclusive right to manufacture new aircraft; previously, Viking had purchased in May 2005 the right to manufacture spares and distribute the de Havilland heritage aircraft product line.

Despite the transfer of its light aircraft certificates to a new owner, de Havilland Canada has left a legacy of innovative and unique aerospace designs and its products are still flying in considerable numbers worldwide, and it has become a productive member of the Bombardier Aerospace stable.  The Downsview plant still turns out civilian propeller aircraft, and the facility maintains thousands of employees.

In November 2018, Viking Air parent Longview Aviation Capital Corporation acquired the Bombardier Dash 8 programme and the de Havilland brand from Bombardier, in a deal that was expected to close by the second half of 2019. In January 2019, Longview announced that it would establish a new company in Ontario, to be called de Havilland Aircraft Co. of Canada, to continue production of the Q400 model and support the Dash 8 range. The deal closed on 3 June 2019; the newly formed company inherited an order book of 51 Q400s. Longview did not intend to merge Viking Air and De Havilland. Some 1200 Bombardier staff transferred to the new De Havilland company, which intended to continue Dash 8-400 production at Downsview until a lease expires in 2023 and hopes to negotiate an extension to that date. Other Dash 8 variants are also under consideration, in particular to target the North American 50-seater market.

In February 2022, Longview consolidated its activities, with Viking Air, Longview Aviation, Pacific Sky Training and De Havilland Canada all being rebranded as De Havilland Aircraft of Canada.
In June 2022, after a celebration with 10 DHC types present, from a 1942 Tiger Moth to a 2019 DHC-8-400, the last DHC aircraft left the Downsview site.

In September 2022, De Havilland Canada announced that Wheatland County, Alberta, was to be the location of its new production site, to be known as De Havilland Field. The facility will initially manufacture the DHC-515 fire-fighting aircraft; the DHC-6 Twin Otter and the Dash 8-400 will also be assembled at De Havilland Field once production resumes.

Aircraft

Spacecraft 
Alouette 1

See also 
 Bombardier Aerospace
 Canadair
 Canadian Air and Space Museum
 de Havilland
 Learjet
 List of civil aircraft
 List of STOL aircraft
 Shorts
 Viking Air

References 

Notes

Citations

Bibliography

 Hotson, Fred W. The de Havilland Canada Story. Toronto: CANAV Books, 1983. .
 Milberry, Larry. Aviation In Canada. Toronto: McGraw-Hill Ryerson Ltd., 1979. .
 Molson, Ken M. and Harold A. Taylor. Canadian Aircraft Since 1909. Stittsville, Ontario: Canada's Wings, Inc., 1982. .

External links 

 Official website.
The Canadian Encyclopedia, de Havilland Aircraft of Canada Limited
 BAE Systems, Heritage - De Havilland Canada

 
Aviation history of Canada
Bombardier Aerospace
Former defence companies of Canada
World War II military equipment of Canada
Canadian brands
Thomson family